The Jericho Appreciation Society (JAS) is a villainous professional wrestling stable formed in American professional wrestling promotion All Elite Wrestling (AEW), created and led by Chris Jericho and also appears in AEW's sister promotion, Ring of Honor (ROH), and Pro Wrestling Guerrilla (PWG). The group also consists of Daniel Garcia, Jake Hager,  Angelo Parker, Matt Menard, Sammy Guevara, Tay Melo, and Anna Jay A.S..

The gimmick of the group uses the references of "sports entertainment", a term used by WWE, where Jericho previously wrestled from 1999 until 2018.

History

All Elite Wrestling and Ring of Honor (2022–present)
On March 6 at Revolution, Chris Jericho was defeated by Eddie Kingston. On March 9, Jericho turned heel when he, 2point0, Daniel Garcia, and Jake Hager attacked Santana and Ortiz, and Kingston.  The following week, Jericho stated that the fans and the Inner Circle did not appreciate him and that Eddie Kingston embarrassed him by making him tap out. He then dubbed the stable as "sports-entertainers" who beat up wrestlers. On the May 11 episode of Dynamite, Kingston along with Santana and Ortiz, united with the Blackpool Combat Club (William Regal, Bryan Danielson, Jon Moxley, and Wheeler Yuta) to fight off the Jericho Appreciation Society. 

The following week, Kingston agreed to team with Moxley and Danielson, along with Santana and Ortiz, to wrestle the Jericho Appreciation Society in an Anarchy in the Arena match at Double or Nothing, in which the Jericho Appreciation Society emerged victorious.  On June 15 at Road Rager, Jericho defeated Ortiz in a Hair vs. Hair match following interference from former Inner Circle teammate Sammy Guevara, who joined the stable along with his fiancé, Tay Conti. On June 26, 2022, at AEW x NJPW: Forbidden Door, Chris Jericho and Sammy Guevara, under the sub-unit of "Le Sex Gods"  teamed up with Minoru Suzuki to defeat Eddie Kingston, Shota Umino, and Wheeler Yuta. At Blood and Guts on June 29, The JAS were defeated by the Blackpool Combat Club, Santana and Ortiz, and Kingston in a Blood and Guts match. On July 20 at Fyter Fest, Anna Jay joined the stable after attacking Ruby Soho and allowing the JAS to help Jericho defeat Kingston in a "Barbed Wire Everywhere Deathmatch". On August 17, after Bryan Danielson defeated Daniel Garcia on a 2 out of 3 falls match, Jericho attacked Danielson from behind but was pulled off by Garcia, who slapped his hand away before Jericho left the ring. On September 4 at All Out, Jericho defeated Danielson after which he celebrated with the entirety of the JAS, minus Garcia. The following week on Dynamite, Garcia defeated Wheeler Yuta for the ROH Pure Championship. After the match, he showed respect to Yuta and celebrated with Danielson, increasing tensions between Jericho and Garcia.

On September 22 during Dynamite: Grand Slam, Jericho defeated Claudio Castagnoli to win the ROH World Championship, marking his overall eighth world title.  The following week on Dynamite, Jericho gave Garcia a bucket hat as a peace offering but demanded he picks a side. Garcia threw down the hat and told Jericho he didn't take orders from him.  Bryan Danielson came down and told Garcia to make his own decision, and offered him a spot in the Blackpool Combat Club. The next week Danielson and Garcia teamed up in a tag team match against Jericho and Sammy Guevara. Jericho and Guevara would win the match following Jericho hitting Garcia with his Ring of Honor World Championship belt.

On the October 12 episode of Dynamite, Garcia would assist Jericho in retaining the ROH World Championship against Danielson, realigning himself with the JAS. There was some brief dissension within the JAS as Jericho was forced to defend the title against Guevara as well as Claudio Castagnoli and Bryan Danielson in a four-way match at Full Gear, which Jericho retained.

At Final Battle, Parker and Menard defeated Shinobi Shadow Squad (Cheeseburger and Eli Isom) on the pre-show while Garcia lost the Pure Championship to Wheeler Yuta and Jericho lost the ROH World Championship to Claudio Castagnoli.

Pro Wrestling Guerrilla (2023–present)
Shortly after the formation of JAS, Garcia enjoyed success in Pro Wrestling Guerrilla (PWG) by cashing in his PWG World Championship opportunity which he earned by winning the Battle of Los Angeles earlier in the year, at Delivering The Goods in May 2022. Garcia went on to defeat Bandido to win the title.

At the 2023 Battle of Los Angeles, Garcia was supposed to compete in a six-man tag team match but he refused to team with his partners and said that he only teamed with "sports entertainers", leading to the surprise appearance of JAS in PWG and marked Jericho's surprise debut in PWG. Guevara made his return to PWG after a four-year absence while Menard and Parker made their return after a fourteen-year absence. JAS went on to defeat Jonathan Gresham, Kevin Blackwood, Michael Oku, Player Uno and SB Kento in a ten-man tag team match.

Members

Current

Timeline 

Sub-groups

Current

Championships and accomplishments
 Lucha Libre AAA Worldwide
 AAA World Mixed Tag Team Championship (1 time) – Guevara and Conti/Melo
 Pro Wrestling Illustrated
 Ranked Jericho No. 22. of the top 500 singles wrestlers in the PWI 500 in 2022
 Ranked Guevara No. 28 of the top 500 singles wrestlers in the PWI 500 in 2022
 Ranked Garcia No. 48 of the top 500 singles wrestlers in the PWI 500 in 2022
 Ranked Hager No. 301 of the top 500 singles wrestlers in the PWI 500 in 2022
 Ranked Parker No. 368 of the top 500 singles wrestlers in the PWI 500 in 2022
 Ranked Menard No. 369 of the top 500 singles wrestlers in the PWI 500 in 2022
 Ranked Jay No. 103 of the top 150 female wrestlers in the PWI Women's 150 in 2022
 Ranked Melo No. 127 of the top 150 singles wrestlers in the PWI Women's 150 in 2022
Pro Wrestling Guerrilla
PWG World Championship (1 time, current) – Garcia
Ring of Honor
ROH World Championship (1 time) – Jericho
ROH Pure Championship (1 time) – Garcia

References 

All Elite Wrestling teams and stables
Ring of Honor teams and stables